Decio is both a given name and a surname. Notable people with the name include:

Given name
 Decio Azzolini (seniore) (1549-1587), Italian Roman Catholic cardinal
 Decio Carafa (1556-1626), Italian Archbishop
 Decio Termisani (1565-1600), Italian painter
 Decio Caracciolo Rosso (died 1613), Italian Roman Catholic prelate
 Decio Azzolino (1623-1689), Italian Catholic Cardinal
 Décio Villares (1851-1931), Brazilian artist and sculptor
 Decio Vinciguerra (1856-1934), Italian physician and ichthyologist
 Decio Pavani (1891-unknown), Italian gymnast
 Decio Klettenberg (1902-unknown), Brazilian rower
 Decio Scuri (1905-1980), Italian basketball coach and administrator
 Decio Trovati (1906-unknown), Italian hockey player
 Décio Esteves (1927-2000), Brazilian football manager and midfielder
 Décio Pignatari (1927-2012), Brazilian poet and essayist
 Décio de Azevedo (born 1939), Brazilian volleyball player
 Décio (footballer) (1941-2000), full name Décio Randazzo Teixeira, Brazilian football defender
 Decio López (born 1946), Colombian football defender
 Décio Sá (1970-2012), Brazilian political journalist

Surname
 Filippo Decio (1454-1535), Italian jurist

Other uses
 Estádio Décio Vitta, Brazilian football stadium in Americana, São Paulo